Nový Žďár (German: Neuenbrand) is a small border village in Karlovy Vary Region, Czech Republic; it is one of the districts of Aš. In 2001 the village had a population of 24.

Geography 
Nový Žďár lies 2,5 kilometres south from Aš, about 628 meters above sea level. It neighbour with Aš to the north and with Nebesa to the east.  To the west there is the German border.  Most of the surrounding area is covered by forests.

History 
Nový Žďár was first mentioned in 1569, as a feudatory of the Zedtwitz.

Etymology 
In Czech, Nový means New. Word Žďár is from žďárovat, which means burn out the roots

Landmarks 
 Historical boundary marker with coat-of-arms of the Zedtwitz (Aš-region, Bohemia) and Lindenfels (from Erkersreuth, Bavaria) from 1718-1754.

Gallery

References 

Aš
Villages in Cheb District